Kailidiscus is an extinct genus of echinoderms which existed in what is now China during the Middle Cambrian period. It was named by Yuanlong Zhao, Colin D. Sumrall, Ronald L. Parsley and Jin Peng in 2010, and the type and only species is Kailidiscus chinensis.

References

Edrioasteroidea
Prehistoric Crinozoa genera
Cambrian echinoderms
Fossil taxa described in 2010
Fossils of China